William "Podge" Maunder (30 November 1902 – 25 June 1964) was an Australian soccer player. Maunder is recognised as the player who scored Australia's first international goal.

Early life
Maunder was born in Newcastle in 1902. His father, known as "Doey" Maunder was a prominent local soccer player. William Maunder's brother, Henry also took up the game and William and Henry appeared in an international match together against Canada in 1924.

Club career
In his club career, Maunder scored more than 500 goals in Northern NSW competition and was offered a professional contract by Scottish club St Mirren F.C.

International career
Maunder made his international debut for Australia on 17 June 1922 in Australia's first recognised international match, scoring on 45 minutes. Maunder played nine matches for Australia between 1922 and 1930, scoring six goals and captaining for one match on 28 June 1924 against Canada.

Career statistics

International

Scores and results list Australia's goal tally first, score column indicates score after each Australia goal.

References

Australian soccer players
Australia international soccer players
1902 births
1964 deaths
Association football forwards
Soccer players from New South Wales